Uri Kokia (born May 14, 1981) is an Israeli professional basketball coach and a former professional basketball player. He is the current head coach for Ironi Ramat Gan of the Liga Artzit. Kokia played as a  center/power forward position and was a member of the Israel national basketball team. He was named the Israeli Basketball Super League Most Improved Player in 2009. In November 2017, Kokia publicly came out as gay.

Basketball career

Uri Kokia began playing basketball with sport clubs Elitzur Yavneh and Maccabi Rehovot.  At 21 years of age, Kokia entered the Premier League, playing for Hapoel Galil Elyon.

He played five seasons for Ironi Nahariya, and has also played for Bnei Hasharon, Maccabi Haifa (after the 2007-08 season), Hapoel Holon, and Hapoel Jerusalem (for whom he was team captain). He was named the Israeli Basketball Super League Most Improved Player in 2009.

In 2010, at the age of 29, Kokia was slated to make his Israel national team debut for the start of the 2011 EuroBasket qualifying campaign.  In November 2010, he suffered a torn tendon in his shoulder.

On June 19, 2018, Kokia joined his former team Elitzur Yavne of the Liga Leumit. However, on January 20, 2019, Kokia parted ways with Yavne and joined Hapoel Ramat Gan Givatayim for the rest of the season.

Coaching career
In the 2014/2015 Premier League season he was named Hapoel Jerusalem assistant head coach, he won the team's first championship.

On August 8, 2019, Kokia was named Ironi Ramat Gan new head coach for the 2019–20 season.

Personal life
On November 28, 2017, Kokia came out as gay, becoming the first male professional basketball player in Israel to publicly do so.

References

External links
Hapoel Jerusalem B.C. profile
Maccabi Haifa profile
Israel Basketball Association profile

1981 births
Living people
Bnei HaSharon players
Centers (basketball)
Elitzur Yavne B.C. players
Maccabi Rehovot B.C. players
Hapoel Galil Elyon players
Hapoel Holon players
Hapoel Jerusalem B.C. players
Hapoel Ramat Gan Givatayim B.C. players
Ironi Nahariya players
Israeli men's basketball players
Maccabi Haifa B.C. players
Maccabi Kiryat Gat B.C. players
Power forwards (basketball)
Sportspeople from Yavne
Israeli people of Georgian-Jewish descent
LGBT basketball players
Israeli LGBT sportspeople
Israeli gay men
Gay sportsmen
Gay Jews